Nahida Lazarus (born February 3, 1849) was a German–Jewish author, essayist, scholar, and literary critic. She was born in Berlin into a German Christian family. She was married first to Dr. Max Remy (in her writings she still signed herself Nahida Remy), after whose death she became a convert to Judaism and married the German philosopher Professor Moritz Lazarus in 1895.

Nahida Lazarus contributed many essays to the Vossische Zeitung, Monatszeitung, and Westermann's Monatshefte about history, art, sociology, and theatrical criticism. She was the author of several dramas, including Die Rechnung ohne Wirth (1870), Wo die Orangen blühen (1872), Constanze 1879, Die Grafen Eckardstein (1880), Schicksalswege (1880), Domenico, Nationale Gegensätze (1884), Sicilianische Novellen (1885), and Liebeszauber, (1887). She  wrote the essays "Geheime Gewalten" in 1890, "Das Jüdische Weib" in 1892, "Das Gebet in Bibel und Talmud" in 1892, "Kulturstudien über das Judentum," in 1893, "Humanität im Judentum," in 1894. She wrote "Ich suchte Dich," an autobiography, in 1898. After the death of her husband, she prepared a volume of his "Lebenserinnerungen".

Sources

 	LAZARUS, NAHIDA RUTH on the Jewish Encyclopedia

External links
Guide to the Nahida Ruth Lazarus Collection at the Leo Baeck Institute, New York.

19th-century converts to Judaism
Converts to Judaism from Christianity
1849 births
1928 deaths
Year of death unknown
19th-century German Jews
German women writers
German women essayists
German essayists
Jewish German writers